Vaccinium tenellum, the small black blueberry is a plant species native to the southeastern United States from southeastern Mississippi to northern Florida to southern Virginia. It grows in forests and in shrubby areas at elevations up to 200 m.

Vaccinium tenellum is a deciduous shrub up to 80 cm tall, often forming large colonies. Leaves are elliptic, up to 4 cm long. Flowers are white or pale pink, cylindrical, up to 10 mm long. Fruits are very dark blue, almost black, about 7 mm across.

References

tenellum
Flora of the Southeastern United States
Blueberries